Paracymoriza stigmatalis is a moth in the family Crambidae. It was described by Charles Swinhoe in 1894. It is found in northeast India's Khasi Hills.

References

Acentropinae
Moths described in 1894